The 1995–96 Elitserien was the 62nd season of the top division of Swedish handball. 12 teams competed in the league. The league was split into an autumn league and a spring league. The eight highest placed teams in the autumn league qualified for the spring league. Redbergslids IK won the regular season and also won the playoffs to claim their 15th Swedish title.

League tables

Autumn

Spring

Playoffs

Quarterfinals
 HK Drott–IF Guif 34–33, 25–23 (HK Drott won series 2–0)
 LUGI–Skövde HF 22–25, 28–21, 24–23 (LUGI won series 2–1)

Semifinals
 Redbergslids IK–HK Drott 27–26 a.e.t., 25–29, 35–23 (Redbergslids IK won series 2–1)
 LUGI–IK Sävehof 29–25, 29–22 (LUGI won series 2–0)

Finals
 Redbergslids IK–LUGI 27–25, 28–25, 30–15 (Redbergslids IK won series 3–0)

References 

Swedish handball competitions